In mathematics, a quantum groupoid is any of a number of notions in noncommutative geometry analogous to the notion of groupoid. In usual geometry, the information of a groupoid can be contained in its monoidal category of representations (by a version of Tannaka–Krein duality), in its groupoid algebra or in the commutative Hopf algebroid of functions on the groupoid. Thus formalisms trying to capture quantum groupoids include certain classes of (autonomous) monoidal categories, Hopf algebroids etc.

References
 Ross Street, Brian Day, "Quantum categories, star autonomy, and quantum groupoids", in "Galois Theory, Hopf Algebras, and Semiabelian Categories", Fields Institute Communications 43 (American Math. Soc. 2004) 187–226; 
 Gabriella Böhm, "Hopf algebroids", (a chapter of) Handbook of algebra, Vol. 6, ed. by M. Hazewinkel, Elsevier 2009, 173–236 
 Jiang-Hua Lu, "Hopf algebroids and quantum groupoids", Int. J. Math. 7, n. 1 (1996) pp. 47–70, 

Algebraic structures